The Narrators is a monthly true storytelling show and podcast from Denver, Colorado, hosted by Ron S. Doyle and Buntport Theater's Erin Rollman, and founded in 2010 by standup comedian Andrew Orvedahl.

Live event 
The monthly show takes place every third Wednesday of the month at Buntport Theater in Denver. During the COVID-19 pandemic, the show shifted to virtual shows and outdoor performances at the EXDO Events Center in Denver. The Narrators also hosts a variety of special events in partnership with other organizations.

In 2019, The Narrators was named "Best Storytelling Show" in Westword's Best of Denver awards.

Podcast 
The Narrators produces a weekly companion podcast that features selected stories from the show's live events. The podcast was named one of "Ten Essential Denver Podcasts" by Westword in 2016 and one of "9 Essential Denver Podcasts You Should Be Listening To" by 303 Magazine in 2019. As of 2021, the podcast is produced by Ron S. Doyle, Karen Wachtel, Scott Carney, Jessi Whitten, and Sydney Crain.

In 2022, the podcast was named "Best Podcast" in Westword's Best of Denver awards.

Notable performers 

 Adam Cayton-Holland
 Alex Landau
 Alexander Chee
 Amber Tozer
 Andrew Orvedahl
 Aparna Nancherla
 Baron Vaughn
 Ben Roy
 Beth Stelling
 Cameron Esposito
 Candi CdeBaca
 Chris Fairbanks
 Chris Garcia
 Dave Ross
 David Gborie
 Dessa
 Dr. Kevin Fitzgerald
 Drennon Davis
 Flobots
 Hutch Harris
Jordan Temple
 Josh Blue
 Ken Arkind
 Kyle Kinane
 Lonnie MF Allen
 Magic Cyclops
 Maria Thayer
 Matt Braunger
 Milk Blossoms
 Porlolo
 R. Alan Brooks
 Ramon Rivas
 Rick Griffith
 Ron Lynch
 Sean Patton
 Sonya Eddy
 Stephen Graham Jones
 The Nix Bros.
 Whitmer Thomas
 Yvie Oddly

References

Storytelling events
Storytelling organizations
Storytelling
Audio podcasts